Atharvaa Murali is an Indian actor who works in Tamil cinema. The son of actor Murali and grandson of director S. Siddalingaiah, Atharvaa began his acting career with Baana Kaathadi (2010). He then garnered critical acclaim for his performance as a youngster suffering from delusion in the romantic thriller Muppozhudhum Un Karpanaigal (2012), before signing on to feature in Bala's period film Paradesi (2013). His role as a rural villager held as a slave in a tea plantation became his breakthrough performance, earning Atharvaa a Filmfare Award for Best Actor in Tamil.

Early life 
Atharva was born as the second child to actor Murali and his wife, Shobha. He also has an elder sister, Kavya, and a younger brother, Akash. He did his schooling in St. Michael's Academy. He attended Sathyabama Institute of Science and Technology, majoring in engineering.

Career

2010–2017

In 2009, his father found him an offer to play the lead role in a film to be produced by Sathya Jyothi Films and directed by Badri Venkatesh. Titled Baana Kaathadi, the film launched in March 2009 and had Atharvaa pair up with fellow rookie actress Samantha. Portraying a youngster from the Royapuram slum area, he stayed in the locality for forty-five days to learn about the lifestyle, while he also learned to fly a kite for the film, canning scenes at the Gujarat Kite Festival. The film, which also had Murali making a special appearance, released in August 2010 with critics mostly praising his debut performance with Sify.com writing he "makes a promising debut and he dances and emotes well". Similarly a critic from Rediff.com added "romance is a cake-walk" for the actor, drawing comparison with his father's performances in romantic roles, though noted "his dialogue delivery is a little too melodramatic". He subsequently gained recognition at the Edison Awards for Best Debut Actor, while also receiving a nomination from the Vijay Awards in the same category. The success of the film prompted Murali to begin pre-production on a Tamil and Kannada bilingual film which would feature Atharvaa. However, a month after Baana Kaathadi'''s release, his father Murali died after suffering cardiac arrest. Atharvaa consequently took a break to spend time with his family, before beginning work on a different venture.

Gautham Vasudev Menon had previously shown interest in directing Atharvaa for a film. A year later, his next release was Muppozhudhum Un Karpanaigal where he played a youngster suffering from hallucinations, film had an average collection and his performance was stated by Sify.com as “good but has miles to go in the histrionics department and voice modulation”. His biggest movie was Paradesi under the direction of Bala, for which he won multiple awards including the Filmfare Award for Best Actor – Tamil. His next film was Sargunam's Chandi Veeran alongside actress Anandhi, which was a flop the box office.

Atharvaa's Eetti, a sports drama film produced by S. Michael Rayappan, in which he pairs up with Sri Divya and the thriller Kanithan in which he features alongside Catherine Tresa, were hits in the box office. In January 2016, he announced that he had set up a production studio called Kickass Entertainment. The first film under his banner would be directed by Badri Venkatesh, who had introduced Atharvaa as an actor. In 2017, Gemini Ganeshanum Suruli Raajanum was released, starring the movie along with Aishwarya Rajesh, Regina Cassandra, Pranitha and Aaditi Pohankar.

2018–present

After many postponements and release issues, Atharvaa's debut production Semma Botha Aagathey (2018), directed by Badri Venkatesh released and was an average success. The next was a mystery thriller, Imaikkaa Nodigal (2018) in which he acted as Nayanthara's brother (Arjun). He received major recognition for this movie. In March 2019, Boomerang, featuring alongside Megha Akash, was released to average reviews. In September 2019, Atharvaa made his Telugu debut in the film Gaddalakonda Ganesh.

In 2021, Atharvaa was seen in Navarasa, an anthology streaming television series on Netflix. He then starred in Thalli Pogathey, remake of the Telugu film Ninnu Kori''.

Filmography

Music Videos

WebSeries

Awards and nominations

References

External links

 
 

Indian male film actors
Male actors in Tamil cinema
21st-century Indian male actors
Filmfare Awards South winners
Male actors from Chennai
Kannada people
Living people
1989 births
Tamil actors